Jenny D. A. Campbell (1895–1970) was a Scottish artist. Works by Campbell are held at the Auckland Art Gallery Toi o Tāmaki and the Museum of New Zealand Te Papa Tongarewa. Her prints are featured in Margaret Dobson's book Block-Cutting and Print-Making by Hand (1928).

Born in Ayr, Scotland, Campbell moved to New Zealand in 1922 with fellow artist Roland Hipkins. Campbell married Hipkins in 1923 and they settled in Napier and then Wellington.

Education 
Campbell trained at the Edinburgh College of Art and was awarded a Diploma. After receiving a travel scholarship, she also studied in Belgium, Holland, and France.

Career 
Campbell worked mainly in oils, specifically portraiture and landscapes. She also worked with colour-block printing, including linocuts. Works by Campbell include: Two Boys with Kites (1924) and Lake Taupo.

Exhibitions 
Campbell exhibited with the:    
 Auckland Society of Arts
 Canterbury Society of Arts
 New Zealand Academy of Fine Arts
 Otago Art Society
 The Group in 1933, 1934, 1938 (as a guest artist, alongside her husband Ronald Hipkins)

References

Further reading 
Artist files for Jenny Campbell are held at:
 E. H. McCormick Research Library, Auckland Art Gallery Toi o Tāmaki
 Hocken Collections Uare Taoka o Hākena
 Te Aka Matua Research Library, Museum of New Zealand Te Papa Tongarewa
Also see:
 Concise Dictionary of New Zealand Artists McGahey, Kate (2000) Gilt Edge
 New Zealand Art: A Centennial Exhibition (1940)

1895 births
1970 deaths
New Zealand painters
New Zealand women painters
People from Ayr
Alumni of the Edinburgh College of Art
People associated with the Museum of New Zealand Te Papa Tongarewa
Scottish emigrants to New Zealand
People associated with the Canterbury Society of Arts
People associated with the Auckland Society of Arts
People associated with The Group (New Zealand art)